Bob and Mike Bryan were the defending champions, but decided to compete in Tokyo instead.
Max Mirnyi and Horia Tecău won the title, defeating Fabio Fognini and Andreas Seppi in the final, 6–4, 6–2.

Seeds

Draw

Draw

References
 Main Draw

Open Mens Doubles